Lip Service (Hangul: 립서비스), was a South Korean trio formed by Now Entertainment in Seoul, South Korea. They debuted on February 4, 2014, with the single "Yum Yum Yum".

On August 19, 2017, BiPa announced via her Instagram account that the group had "effectively disbanded", which was further confirmed by the group's official media going inactive roughly around the same time. Since the disbandment, Anna has joined the dance team "Aura" using her birth name Eunkyung, and performed as a backup dancer for Shinee's Taemin's performance of "Move" during the 2018 Dream Concert while BiPa has become a model and is working on her solo music career.

Members

Former members
 BiPa (비파) 
 Anna (애나) 
 Cora (코라) 
 CinD (신디)

Discography

Extended plays

Singles

Soundtrack appearances

References

External links
 

K-pop music groups
South Korean girl groups
South Korean musical duos
South Korean pop music groups
South Korean dance music groups
Musical groups from Seoul
Musical groups established in 2014
2014 establishments in South Korea
Musical groups disestablished in 2017
2017 disestablishments in South Korea